Knoxville College is a historically black liberal arts college in Knoxville, Tennessee, United States, which was founded in 1875 by the United Presbyterian Church of North America. It is a United Negro College Fund member school.

A slow period of decline began in the 1970s, and by 2015, the school had an enrollment of just 11 students. In May 2015, the college suspended classes until Fall 2016 term in hopes of reorganizing. On May 17, 2018, the Tennessee Higher Education Commission gave its approval for Knoxville College to once again reopen its doors and offer classes. 

On July 1, 2018, Knoxville College website announced resumption of enrolling students for fall 2018 semester. In May 2022, only three students graduated.

History

Establishment
Knoxville College is rooted in a mission school established in Knoxville in 1864 by R. J. Creswell of the United Presbyterian Church to educate the city's free Black and formerly enslaved people.  This school initially met in the First Baptist Church building (which at the time was located on Gay Street) before moving to a permanent facility in East Knoxville in 1866.  In spite of general apathy from the city's leaders and threats from poor whites, the school's enrollment gradually grew to over 100. In addition to black students, the school also had many white students until 1901, when Tennessee passed a law forcibly segregating all schools.

In the 1870s, the church's Freedmen's Mission, which had established mission schools for freed slaves across the South, decided to refocus its efforts on building a larger, better-equipped school in Knoxville, in part due to stiff competition from other denominations in Nashville.  In 1875, the church sold its East Knoxville property and purchased its current property, which at the time consisted of a hill that had been occupied by a Confederate battery during the Civil War.  The school's first building, McKee Hall, named for the Reverend O.S. McKee, was completed in 1876, and the school opened in December of that year.  Former governor William G. Brownlow and gubernatorial candidate William F. Yardley spoke at the opening ceremonies.

The Reverend J. S. McCulloch was named the school's first principal, and Eliza B. Wallace was named the school's principal of female students.  The new school was primarily a normal school, which trained teachers, but also operated an academy for the education of local children.  In 1877, the school was designated a college by the state, to the surprise of McCulloch, as few of the school's students were ready for a college-level curriculum.  In 1890, the state designated the school the recipient of its Morrill Act funds for blacks, with which the school established mechanical and agricultural departments.

Early 20th century growth

In 1901, Knoxville College finally received a charter from the State of Tennessee.  Six years later, the school established the Eliza B. Wallace Hospital, which served a dual purpose of training nurses and tending to the health needs of the local black community. This proved invaluable during the city's Influenza outbreak of 1918.

In 1913, John Henry Michael, the head of the school's mechanical department, designed the "Negro Building" for the National Conservation Exposition, which was held across town at Chilhowee Park.  The building, which is no longer standing, was constructed with the help of Knoxville College students.

During World War I, Knoxville College students helped raise money for liberty bonds and the Red Cross.  In the aftermath of the Riot of 1919, one of the city's worst racial episodes, the school's administration (comprising black and white members) staunchly defended the city's African American community, and praised its students' restraint.  In 1925, Knoxville College students staged a month-long boycott of classes to protest the school's strict behavioral code, culminating in an all-night negotiating session between student leaders and the school's dean, Herbert Telford.  Telford agreed to relax some rules, and allowed the creation of a student council.

In 1957, Knoxville College became one of the first group of predominantly black institutions admitted to full membership in the Southern Association of Colleges and Schools (SACS). Throughout the summer of 1960, Knoxville College students engaged in a series of sit-ins to protest segregation at lunch counters in downtown Knoxville, eventually convincing most downtown businesses to end the practice.  The school's charter was amended in 1962 to allow the admission of white students.

Accreditation loss, reorganization attempts, and closure
Beginning in the 1970s, Knoxville College began to struggle financially, leading to a gradual decline. In 1997, the Southern Association of Colleges and Schools withdrew Knoxville College's accreditation; enrollment dropped precipitously and the school's financial situation became dire.  As enrollment plummeted, the school's debt skyrocketed and it was soon unable to pay its faculty or electric bills. Throughout the rest of the 1990s, as enrollment plummeted, most campus buildings were shuttered and abandoned, with most degree programs being discontinued. In August 2005, the school's Board of Trustees fired the school's president, Barbara Hatton.

Following Hatton's removal, the school's alumni association embarked on an aggressive fundraising campaign in 2006 and 2007 to save the college and return it to solvency.  In January 2010, the school hired Dr. Horace A. Judson as interim president. Judson implemented a new strategic plan with the following goals: (1) regain accreditation, (2) achieve fiscal stability, (3) develop academic program distinctiveness, (4) develop a department of enrollment management, (5) develop a quality student-centered living and learning environment, and (6) establish new relationships and strengthen former ones among key constituents.

However, Judson soon left and the college continued to struggle. On June 9, 2014, the Environmental Protection Agency seized control of the long-shuttered A.K. Stewart Science Hall to conduct an emergency clean-up of toxic chemicals that the college had improperly stored in laboratories; In early 2015 state accreditation for the college was withdrawn, further complicating the college's already strained finances. In April 2015, the school announced it was suspending classes for the Fall 2015 term in hopes of reorganizing.  Enrollment had dwindled to just 11 students, and the college was struggling to pay back a $4.5 million loan from 2003 and more than $425,000 to the federal government for the Stewart Science Hall cleanup.  In May 2015, the school announced classes would resume in the Fall 2016 term.

In May 2016, the Tennessee Department of Environment and Conservation recommended the college become a state Superfund site due to ongoing contamination concerns from the Stewart Science Hall. In September 2016, the City of Knoxville demanded that Knoxville College make repairs to fourteen of its buildings within 90 days or face condemnation. City crews subsequently boarded up the buildings. The Knoxville Fire Department responded to between four and five fires at abandoned buildings on campus in 2016, and estimated that since the buildings began falling into disuse after 1997, they had responded to twenty or thirty such fires there.

, most of the campus sits abandoned, in an advanced state of disrepair. Most buildings are open to vagrants and vandals. This has caused severe damage to the buildings. The former college center has been set on fire twice. Since early 2018 The college administrative offices are back on campus again, occupying The college Annex which is next to McMillan Chapel. Plans have been made to renovate McMillan chapel and the Alumni Library. This is scheduled to take place in 2019.

Campus

Knoxville College is situated on a 17-building,  campus, located atop a hill overlooking the Mechanicsville neighborhood, just northwest of Knoxville's downtown area.  Along with administration and classroom buildings, the campus includes a performing arts center, a gymnasium, a library, a chapel, and a student center.  The school maintains dormitories for on-campus students, as well as a president's house, and cottages and apartments for faculty.

Knoxville College Historic District

In 1980, eight buildings on the Knoxville College campus received recognition for having a role in minority education on the National Register of Historic Places as a historic district.  Many of the earliest buildings were constructed using student labor, student-made bricks, and lumber donated by alumni.  The district includes the following buildings:

McKee Hall, the oldest building on campus, originally built in 1876, largely rebuilt in 1895 following a fire.  The building is named for the Reverend O.S. McKee, who had established the first school for African-American children in Nashville in 1862.  This building currently houses administration offices.
The President's House, built in the late 1880s.  The house was originally built of wood, but brick siding was added in 1905.
Wallace Hall, built in 1890 as an orphanage.  This building is named for Eliza B. Wallace, the school's principal of female students, 1877–1897.
Elnathan Hall, built in 1898 following the destruction by fire of the original Elnathan Hall, and altered in 1905 and 1971.  This building has served variously as a women's dorm, administration building, and classroom building.
Two Faculty cottages, 1005 and 1009 College Street, both built in the Bungalow style in 1906.
McMillan Chapel, built in 1913, designed by Knoxville College alumnus, William Thomas Jones.  Along with church services, the chapel served as the campus's primary performance venue.  Notable guests who have delivered speeches at the chapel include George Washington Carver, Countee Cullen, W. E. B. Du Bois, Jesse Owens, William H. Hastie and Jackie Robinson.
Giffen Memorial Gymnasium, built in 1929.

In 2016, the preservationist group Knox Heritage placed the Knoxville College Historic District on its "Fragile Fifteen," a list of endangered Knoxville-area historic properties.

Administration
A 16-member Board of Trustees oversees Knoxville College.  Its chairman is Dr. Michael V. Bowie.  The board includes representatives from the Knoxville College National Alumni Association.

The Board of Trustees appoints the president, who is the school's chief administrator. The most recently appointed president, Jacob Savage, was fired by the Board of Trustees on January 23, 2015, three months after he had been hired to replace Evelyn Hallman. He had agreed to take no salary for his position. In July 2017, the Board of Trustees appointed Dr. Keith E. Lindsey as Interim President to guide the rebuilding of the college. The president is assisted by the academic dean, dean of students, director of admissions, and recruitment officer.

Academics
, Knoxville College offered two degrees: the four-year Bachelor of Liberal Studies, and the two year Associate of Arts.  The Bachelor of Liberal Studies includes one of four areas of concentration: Humanities, Business and Computer Sciences, Natural Sciences and Mathematics, or Social and Behavioral Sciences.  The curriculum further requires 15 to 18 semester hours of specialization within each concentration, providing for a more in-depth understanding of a particular field.

Knoxville College followed a debt-free policy that allowed students to complete the degree program without the accumulation of debt.  This was accomplished primarily through its College Work Program, which allowed students to offset much of their tuition costs by working for several hours per week.  This program involved a mix of performing various tasks around campus, community involvement, and internship programs.

Student life

Knoxville College's Student Government Association (SGA), which was elected by the student body, acted as a liaison between students and campus administration.  The SGA was led by a president, elected for one term.

Student activities included a dance team, a debate team, a choir, and a trivia team (which competed with other HBCUs in the Honda Bowl Competition).  The school's newspaper, The Aurora, was published for over a century.  The college also maintained a student ambassador program and wellness program that provided volunteer services for the surrounding community.

After 1997, Knoxville College dropped most athletics programs due to declining enrollment, but as part of its reorganization, hopes to re-establish men's and women's basketball teams, as well as a cheerleading squad.

Notable alumni

References

External links

 

 
African-American history in Knoxville, Tennessee
Educational institutions established in 1875
Historically black universities and colleges in the United States
Universities and colleges in Knoxville, Tennessee
Unaccredited institutions of higher learning in the United States
Private universities and colleges in Tennessee
Historic districts on the National Register of Historic Places in Tennessee
National Register of Historic Places in Knoxville, Tennessee
Abandoned buildings and structures
1875 establishments in Tennessee